Kim Jeong-sin (1919 – 2001) was a South Korean basketball player. He competed in the men's tournament at the 1948 Summer Olympics.

References

1919 births
2001 deaths
South Korean men's basketball players
Olympic basketball players of South Korea
Basketball players at the 1948 Summer Olympics
Sportspeople from Pyongyang